Aleksandar Živković (born 28 July 1977) is a Serbian former professional footballer who played as a midfielder.

Club career
Živković made his senior debuts at his hometown club Radnički Niš, aged 16, which attracted the attention of Partizan. He spent just one year with the Crno-beli, before returning to Čair in 1995. Over the next three seasons, Živković played regularly for the side, making 75 league appearances and scoring six goals. He was subsequently transferred to Belgrade club Rad in 1998. After two seasons with the Građevinari, Živković moved abroad to Japan and joined Júbilo Iwata in mid-2000. He helped the team win the Emperor's Cup in 2003.

In the 2004 winter transfer window, Živković returned to his homeland and signed for Obilić. He also played with OFK Beograd and Voždovac, before going abroad for the second time and joining Shandong Luneng in early 2006. Over the next four seasons, Živković helped the team win two Chinese Super League and one Chinese FA Cup. He also played for Shenzhen Ruby and Guangzhou R&F, before retiring from the game at the age of 34.

International career
In 2001, Živković made two appearances for FR Yugoslavia at the Kirin Cup. He also represented Serbia at the 2008 Summer Olympics as one of the three over-age players alongside Miljan Mrdaković and Vladimir Stojković.

Statistics

Honours
Júbilo Iwata
 Emperor's Cup: 2003
Shandong Luneng
 Chinese Super League: 2006, 2008
 Chinese FA Cup: 2006

References

External links
 
 
 
 
 
 
 
 

Association football midfielders
China League One players
Chinese Super League players
Expatriate footballers in China
Expatriate footballers in Japan
First League of Serbia and Montenegro players
FK Obilić players
FK Partizan players
FK Rad players
FK Radnički Niš players
FK Voždovac players
Footballers at the 2008 Summer Olympics
Guangzhou City F.C. players
J1 League players
Júbilo Iwata players
OFK Beograd players
Olympic footballers of Serbia
Serbia and Montenegro expatriate footballers
Serbia and Montenegro expatriate sportspeople in Japan
Serbia and Montenegro footballers
Serbia and Montenegro international footballers
Serbian expatriate footballers
Serbian expatriate sportspeople in China
Serbian footballers
Shandong Taishan F.C. players
Shenzhen F.C. players
Sportspeople from Niš
1977 births
Living people